The Denmark women's national handball team is the national team of Denmark. It is governed by the Dansk Håndbold Forbund (DHF).

In 1997, it became the first Women's Handball team to hold all three major titles simultaneously (The World Championship, The Olympic Championship and The European Championship).

Denmark women's handball team is the only team (women's and men's) in handball history to win the Olympic Games three consecutive times, earning the gold medal in 1996, 2000, and 2004.

Despite tremendous results, the Danish handball team has seen a steady decline. As of 2021, the team has not won a gold medal since the Olympic Games 2004. However, at the World Championship 2013, the team won its first medal (bronze) at a World Championship since 1997 when the team won gold. It was also the first medal the Danish team had won in 9 years.

Honours

Competitive record
 Champions   Runners-up   Third place   Fourth place

Olympic Games

World Championship

European Championship

Performance in other tournaments
 Carpathian Trophy 1980 – Fifth place
 Carpathian Trophy 1997 – Winner
 GF World Cup '06 – Third place
 GF World Cup '08 – Second place
 Møbelringen Cup 2002 – Winner
 Møbelringen Cup 2003 – Third place
 Møbelringen Cup 2005 – Winner
 Møbelringen Cup 2007 – Third place
 Møbelringen Cup 2008 – Third place
 Møbelringen Cup 2010 – Second place
 Møbelringen Cup 2012 – Second place
 Golden League 2012-13 – Winner
 Golden League 2014-15 – Winner
 Golden League 2016-17 – Third place

Team

Current squad
The squad chosen for Golden League in March 2023.

Head coach: Jesper Jensen

Caps and goals as of 5 March 2022.

Extended squad
The following players have been called up for the pre-squad.

Previous squads

Notable players
Several Danish players have seen their individual performance recognized at international tournaments, either as Most Valuable Player or as a member of the All-Star Team.
MVP
Anja Andersen, 1996 European Championship
Karin Mortensen, 2002 European Championship
All-Star Team
Anette Hoffmann, 1995 World Championship; 2000 Summer Olympics
Anja Andersen, 1996 Summer Olympics
Susanne Munk Wilbek, 1996 Summer Olympics; 1997 World Championship
Camilla Andersen, 1997 World Championship; 1998 European Championship
Tonje Kjærgaard, 1998 European Championship; 1999 World Championship
Janne Kolling, 1998 European Championship; 2000 Summer Olympics
Mette Vestergaard, 2001 World Championship
Kristine Andersen, 2002 European Championship
Line Daugaard, 2002 European Championship; 2004 Summer Olympics
Karin Mortensen, 2002 and 2004 European Championship
Rikke Schmidt, 2004 Summer Olympics
Katrine Fruelund, 2004 Summer Olympics
Josephine Touray, 2004 European Championship
Mie Augustesen, 2010 European Championship
Maibritt Kviesgaard, 2010 European Championship
Line Jørgensen, 2011 World Championship
Maria Fisker, 2013 World Championship; 2014 European Championship
Kristina Kristiansen, 2014 European Championship
Sandra Toft, 2016 and 2020 European Championship, 2021 World Championship
Line Haugsted, 2020 European Championship
Emma Friis, 2022 European Championship
Kathrine Heindahl, 2022 European Championship
Incomplete

Coaching staff

Coaches
List of coaches for Denmark women's national handball team

Individual all-time records

Most matches played
Total number of matches played in official competitions only.

Last updated: 5 March 2023

Most goals scored
Total number of goals scored in official matches only.

Last updated: 5 March 2023

References

External links

IHF profile

Handball
Women's national handball teams
Handball